Leif Uvemark (1939–1996) was a Swedish trumpeter and conductor of Leif Uvemark Bigband. Born in Malmö in 1939, he played in the NDR Bigband in Hamburg for several years and with James Last orchestra 1969-1975.

External links 
www.uvemark.se in Swedish

Musicians from Malmö
1939 births
1996 deaths
James Last Orchestra members